Kim Jong-kook (Hangul: 김종국, Hanja: 金鍾國; born September 14, 1973, in Gwangju, South Korea) is a retired South Korean second baseman who played 14 seasons for the Kia Tigers of the KBO League. He batted and threw right-handed.

He joined the Haitai Tigers in 1996. His batting average was not good, but his fielding was excellent. So he was chosen for the South Korea national baseball team a few times, including during the 2006 World Baseball Classic. This characteristic made his nickname "Defender."

Kim is currently the operations and first base coach for the Kia Tigers.

External links 
Career statistics and player information from Korea Baseball Organization

2006 World Baseball Classic players
Kia Tigers coaches
Kia Tigers players
Haitai Tigers players
KBO League second basemen
South Korean baseball coaches
South Korean baseball players
Korea University alumni
1973 births
Living people
Asian Games medalists in baseball
Baseball players at the 1994 Asian Games
Baseball players at the 2002 Asian Games
Asian Games gold medalists for South Korea
Asian Games silver medalists for South Korea
Medalists at the 1994 Asian Games
Medalists at the 2002 Asian Games
Sportspeople from Gwangju